Morozovka is a rural locality (a village) in Urgalinsky Selsoviet, Belokataysky District, Bashkortostan, Russia. The population was 63 as of 2010. There are 2 streets.

Geography 
Morozovka is located 45 km southeast of Novobelokatay (the district's administrative centre) by road. Urgala is the nearest rural locality.

References 

Rural localities in Belokataysky District